Mike Sands or Michael Sands may refer to:

Michael Sands (media) (1945–2012), American model, actor and media consultant
Mike Sands (athlete) (born 1953), Bahamian former sprint athlete and athletics official
Mike Sands (ice hockey) (born 1963), Canadian former ice hockey player
Michael Sands, Jr. (born 1985), Bahamian sprinter and son of Michael